Trutnov is a town in the Hradec Králové Region of the Czech Republic. It has about 29,000 inhabitants. The town centre is well preserved and is protected by law as an urban monument zone.

Administrative parts

Trutnov is made up of town parts of Dolní Předměstí, Dolní Staré Město, Horní Předměstí, Horní Staré Město, Kryblice, Střední Předměstí and Vnitřní Město, and villages of Adamov, Babí, Bohuslavice, Bojiště, Lhota, Libeč, Nový Rokytník, Oblanov, Poříčí, Starý Rokytník, Střítež, Studenec, Volanov and Voletiny.

Etymology
Both the German name Trautenau and the Czech name Trutnov are derived from the Old German truten ouwe, which meant "cute floodplain".

Geography
A negligible part of the municipal territory borders on Poland. Most of the territory lies in the Giant Mountains Foothills, but it also extends to the Broumov Highlands on the east, and a small northern part extends into the Giant Mountains. The town proper is situated in the valley of the Úpa River.

History
The first written mention of Trutnov is from 1260. It was founded around 1250 by the Švábenský of Švábenice noble family and originally named Úpa after the eponymous river. In 1301, King Wenceslaus II bought the whole area, already called Trutnov. From 1400 to 1599, Trutnov was a dowry town of the Bohemian queens. In 1421, the town was captured by Jan Žižka during the Hussite Wars.

Trutnov was the site of the Battle of Trautenau in 1866 during the Austro-Prussian War.

During the World War II, the German occupiers operated three forced labour camps for Jewish women, located in Horní Staré Město, Poříčí and Libeč, which all became subcamps of the Gross-Rosen concentration camp in March 1944, and a forced labour subcamp of the Stalag VIII-B/344 prisoner-of-war camp for Allied POWs in Libeč. After the war, the remaining German population was expelled in 1945 in accordance with the Potsdam Agreement.

Demographics

Economy

The largest employers based in the town are Vitesco Technologies Czech Republic and Tyco Electronics EC Trutnov, both manufacturers of electrical equipment for automotive industry. The largest non-industrial employer is the Trutnov hospital.

The Krakonoš Brewery was founded in 1582 and is one of the oldest breweries in the country.

Sport
The ice hockey team HC Trutnov is based in the town.

Culture
Trutnov has hosted the Trutnov Open Air Music Festival since 1990 and, since 1999, has hosted Obscene Extreme.

Sights

The historic core comprises the area of Vnitřní Město part of Trutnov, with Krakonoš Square (Krakonošovo náměstí) in its centre. The area was delimited by town walls in the 14th century. Their fragments are preserved to this day. The landmark of the square is the neo-Gothic Old Town Hall, nowadays the tourist information centre. In the middle of the square are a statue of Joseph II, a stone fountain with statue of Krakonoš, and the baroque Holy Trinity Column from 1704.

The most valuable buildings of Trutnov are the three churches. Nativity of Mary Church is a Neoclassical building with late Baroque elements from 1756–1782. The Church of Saint Wenceslaus in Horní Staré Město part of Trutnov is first documented already in 1313. In 1581, it was rebuilt in the Renaissance style, and a tower was added. The neo-Gothic Church of Saints Peter and Paul from 1897–1903 is located in Poříčí.

The Bohuslav Martinů Concert Hall is located in the former Lutheran church, built in the neo-Gothic style in 1900.

Twin towns – sister cities

Trutnov is twinned with:

 Kamienna Góra, Poland
 Kępno, Poland
 Lohfelden, Germany
 Senica, Slovakia
 Strzelin, Poland
 Świdnica, Poland
 Würzburg, Germany

Notable people

Samuel Fritz (1654 – c. 1730), Jesuit missionary who made the first accurate map of the Amazon River
Vincenz Czerny (1842–1916), surgeon
Igo Etrich (1879–1967), Austrian flight pioneer
Friedrich Hopfner (1881–1949), Austrian geodesist and geophysicist
Evelyn Faltis (1887–1937), composer
Elsa Hilger (1904–2005), American cellist
Helen Lewis (1916–2009), dance teacher and choreographer
Norbert Eimer (1940–2021), German politician
Iris Gusner (born 1941), German film director and screenwriter
Rudolf Skácel (born 1979), footballer
Eva Vrabcová-Nývltová (born 1986), athlete
Marcela Krůzová (born 1990), footballer
Šárka Musilová (born 1991), Paralympic archer

In 1974, Václav Havel, the future president of Czechoslovakia and the Czech Republic, worked for nine months at the Krakonoš Brewery.

References

External links

 

 
Cities and towns in the Czech Republic
Populated places in Trutnov District
13th-century establishments in Bohemia
Populated places established in the 13th century